Arthur French, 1st Baron de Freyne and de Freyne (1786 – 29 September 1856) was an Anglo-Irish peer and member of parliament.

De Freyne was the eldest son of Arthur French of Frenchpark and his wife Margaret Costello of Edmondstown. The French family had been major landowners in County Sligo and County Roscommon for many years. He was elected to Parliament for his father's old constituency of Roscommon in 1821, a seat he held until 1832. In 1839 he was raised to the peerage as Baron de Freyne, of Artagh in the County of Roscommon, with remainder to heirs male. Twelve years later, in 1851, he was made Baron de Freyne, of Coolavin in the County of Sligo, with a special remainder to his three younger brothers John, Charles and Fitzstephen. He later served as Lord Lieutenant of County Roscommon from 1855 until his death the following year.

Lord de Freyne married Mary (d. 7 September 1843), daughter of Christopher McDermott, in 1818, but the marriage was childless. He died on 29 September 1856 when the barony of 1839 became extinct. However, he was succeeded in the barony of 1851 according to the special remainder by his younger brother, John.

Arms

References

Sources
 Kidd, Charles, Williamson, David (editors). Debrett's Peerage and Baronetage (1990 edition). New York: St Martin's Press, 1990,  
 
 
 David Beamish's Peerage Page

|-

1786 births
1856 deaths
People from County Roscommon
19th-century Irish people
Barons in the Peerage of the United Kingdom
Lord-Lieutenants of Roscommon
French, Arthur
French, Arthur
French, Arthur
French, Arthur
French, Arthur
UK MPs who were granted peerages
Peers of the United Kingdom created by Queen Victoria